Maria Aloysia Löwenfels (5 July 1915 – 9 August 1942) was a German nun. She converted from Judaism to Catholicism. In 1936, she fled to the convent of the Poor Handmaids of Jesus Christ in Lutterade, Netherlands. In 1938, she was confirmed as a novice. On 9 August 1942, she was murdered in the gas chambers of concentration camp Auschwitz-Birkenau. In 2015, the Roman Catholic Diocese of Limburg announced that a beatification process had been started.

Biography
Löwenfels was born on 5 July 1915 in Trabelsdorf, Bavaria, Germany as Luise Löwenfels in a Jewish family. She went to high school at the  where she became attracted to Catholic faith. On 25 November 1935, Löwenfels was baptised in the convent of the Poor Handmaids of Jesus Christ in Mönchengladbach against the wishes of her family. She started to work as a teacher.

Löwenfels had been planning an escape to Great Britain. In 1936, one of the children accused her of being Jewish, and threatened to expose her to the Gestapo. Löwenfels fled the next morning to Geleen in the Netherlands. In Lutterade near Geleen, there was a convent of the Poor Handmaids  which was founded by German nuns who had fled Germany in 1875 during the Kulturkampf. Löwenfels joined the convent, learned Dutch and started to work as a kindergarten teacher. On 17 September 1938, Löwenfels was confirmed by the Bishop of Roermond as a novice and named Maria Aloysia.

Nazi Germany invaded the Netherlands on 10 May 1940. Löwenfels was contacted by her brother that the family was trying to escape to the United States, however she decided to remain. In 1942, she was ordered to wear the Star of David. In February 1942, there was an audience of the religious leaders of the Netherlands with Reichskommissar Seyss-Inquart during which the anti-Semitic policies were condemned. On 20 July 1942, Johannes de Jong, Archbishop of Utrecht issued a pastoral letter to be read in all churches, protesting against the deportation of the Jews. Seyss-Inquart retaliated by ordering the deportation of all Jews who had converted to Catholicism.

On 2 August 1942, Löwenfels was arrested, and transported to Westerbork transit camp where she arrived on 4 August. On 7 August, she was sent to concentration camp Auschwitz-Birkenau together with 987 other people. On 9 August, she was murdered in the gas chamber.

Aftermath
The convent in Lutterade was torn down. In 2006, a monument was placed in remembrance of Löwenfels at the location of the convent. Her brother managed to escape to the United States.

In 2015, the Apostolic administrator of the Roman Catholic Diocese of Limburg in Germany announced that a beatification process had been started for Sister Maria Alyosa. The postulator is Christiane Humpert. The investigation has focused on whether Löwenfels died as a martyr.

References

1915 births
1942 deaths
Converts to Roman Catholicism from Judaism
German women educators
20th-century German Roman Catholic nuns
German people who died in Auschwitz concentration camp
Jewish emigrants from Nazi Germany to the Netherlands
People from Bamberg (district)
People from the Kingdom of Bavaria
People killed by gas chamber by Nazi Germany